The Gutob or Bodo Gadaba language is a south Munda language of the Austroasiatic language family of India, with the greatest concentrations of speakers being found in Koraput district of Odisha and Visakhapatnam district of Andhra Pradesh. It is also known simply as the Gadaba language, but it is different from the Dravidian Gadaba language. Other names for the Bodo Gadaba language include Gadba, Gutop, Gudwa, Godwa, Gadwa, and Boi Gadaba.

Classification
The Gutob language belongs to the South Munda subgroup of the Munda branch of the Austroasiatic language family. It is most closely related to the Bondo language.

Distribution
Gutob is spoken across southern Odisha and adjacent districts of northern Andhra Pradesh, and is concentrated primarily in Lamptaput block, Koraput district, southern Odisha (Griffiths 2008:634). In recent centuries, Gutob speakers have also migrated to the plains of Andhra Pradesh as well as Rayagada District, including near the town Majiguda (close to Kalyansinghpur) where they live alongside the Dravidian-speaking Kondhs.

Ethnologue reports the following locations.
40 villages of Lamptaput block, Koraput district, southern Odisha
Khoirput block, Malkangiri district, southern Odisha
Visakhapatnam district, northern Andhra Pradesh

Language status
The Gutob language is considered to be either endangered or moribund, due in part to several hydroelectric projects that have displaced Gutob people from their traditional villages and forced them to live as minorities in primarily Desiya-speaking villages. Anderson (2008) estimates the number of speakers at around 10 to 15,000, while the Asha Kiran society, which works in Koraput, estimates the number at less than 5,000. The 2011 census most likely counts Gutob and Ollari as the same language, since they are both called Gadaba by outsiders. Although Gutob-language education has been attempted, it has faced stiff resistance and most parents still want their children to learn Desiya only due to being in mixed villages.

References

Griffiths, Arlo. 2008. In Anderson, Gregory D.S (ed). The Munda languages, 633–681. Routledge Language Family Series 3.New York: Routledge. .

Languages of India
Munda languages
Endangered languages of India
Endangered Austroasiatic languages

br:Gadabeg